The 1999–2000 Princeton Tigers men's basketball team represented the Princeton University in intercollegiate college basketball during the 1999–2000 NCAA Division I men's basketball season. The head coach was Bill Carmody and the team co-captains were Mason Rocca and Chris Young. The team played its home games in the Jadwin Gymnasium on the University campus in Princeton, New Jersey, and was the runner-up of the Ivy League.  The team earned an invitation to the 32-team 2000 National Invitation Tournament.

Using the Princeton offense, the team recovered from a 1–4 start and posted a 19–11 overall record and an 11–3 conference record. On December 18, 1999, against , Spencer Gloger made 10 three-point field goals in a single game to tie Matt Maloney's current Ivy League record with a total that continues to stand as the highest total by an Ivy League player against a non-league foe.

The team was led by All-Ivy League first team selection Chris Young.  The team won the twelfth of twelve consecutive national statistical championships in scoring defense with a 54.6 points allowed average. Young led the Ivy League in field goal percentage with a 55.3% average in conference games.  He also led the conference in blocked shots with 90, which continues to be the second highest single-season total in league history.

This was the last season as coach for Carmody who gave way to John Thompson III the following year. Carmody helped Princeton achieve a 76.1% (210–66) winning percentage for the decade of the 1990s, which was the eighth best in the nation.  Carmody retired with the Ivy League's all-time highest winning percentage in all games (78.6%, 92–25), surpassing Butch van Breda Kolff's 76.9% mark, and in conference games (89.3%, 50–6), surpassing Chuck Daly's 88.1% mark.

References

Princeton Tigers men's basketball seasons
Princeton Tigers
Princeton
Prince
Prince